Emily Patricia Carosone is an Italian-American former professional softball player and coach. Carosone later joined the Italy women's national softball team and competed at the 2020 Summer Olympics.

Life 
She attended Pine Castle Christian High School in Orlando. She later played for and owns the batting crown for the Auburn Tigers softball team in the Southeastern Conference. Carosone led the Tigers to two Women's College World Series appearances and a runner-up finish in 2016. She was later drafted #22 overall and went on to play softball with the Chicago Bandits of the National Pro Fastpitch and joined the Cleveland Comets of the league in 2019.  She currently is an assistant coach for her alma mater.

Statistics

References

External links

Auburn Tigers bio

1997 births
Living people
Softball players from Florida
Auburn Tigers softball players
Chicago Bandits players
Cleveland Comets players
Sportspeople from Orlando, Florida
USSSA Pride players
Italian softball players
Softball players at the 2020 Summer Olympics
Olympic softball players of Italy